Stacey is a  1973 exploitation film directed by Andy Sidaris. Half the budget was provided by Roger Corman for New World Pictures; the rest was raised by Sidaris. It was re-released in 1975 as Stacy and Her Gangbusters.

Plot
The protagonist is Stacey Hanson (Anne Randall), a private eye and race car driver. She is hired by aging heiress Florence Chambers (Marjorie Bennett) to investigate the close members of her family who live in her mansion. Stacey is to determine whether the members of Florence's family are worthy to be included in her will. They are three: Florence's nephew John (Stewart Moss), his wife Tish (Anitra Ford), and Florence's grand-niece Pamela (Cristina Raines).

As it happens, all three potential heirs have something to hide. John is a discreet homosexual, Tish is having an affair with the houseboy, and Pamela has dubious friends. Stacey uncovers some family secrets but a greater scandal is about to begin. The scheming houseboy Frank (James Westmoreland) is murdered. Stacey now has to find the identity of the murderer before he/she can kill again. Frank was sleeping with and/or blackmailing nearly all members of the family, so everyone is a suspect.

Stacey's investigation leads to a helicopter and car chase and gunplay. The murderer turns out to be Pamela who is a member of a cult reminiscent of the Manson family. She was planning to frame John and stand as the last viable heir to the family fortune.

Cast
 Anne Randall as Stacey Hanson
 Marjorie Bennett as Florence Chambers
 Anitra Ford as Tish Chambers
 Alan Landers as Bob Eastwood
 James Westmoreland as Frank Elroy
 Cristina Raines as Pamela Chambers
 Nicholas Georgiade as Matthew
 Richard LePore as Luke
 John Alderman as Dick Hannon
 Stewart Moss as John Chambers

Background
The film features an empowered babe in a masculinized action role. She is "a very private detective" in a crime-fighting film. This was the first attempt by Sidaris to produce a film with a female protagonist fighting crime. The film thus serves as a precursor to many 1980s films, including those produced by Sidaris himself. In these films "soft" women adopt "hard" personae. It is also a precursor to 1990s softcore films where gender has little to do with a heroine's career, as by that point women's advance into the workplace was no longer an exploitable hot topic.

Connections to other films
The material from the film was reworked into another Sidaris film, Malibu Express (1985). The role of Stacey Hanson was divided into two new characters: private detective protagonist Cody Abilene (Darby Hinton) and his girlfriend June Khnockers (Lynda Wiesmeier).

The openings of both films depict their respective female race car drivers in the finish of a practice race. Both films then have them getting out of uniform. But Stacey is the protagonist while June serves mostly as the source of a recurring joke in her film: "Knockers with an 'h'?". June can still reliably drive a high-performance race car, but it is Cody who performs most of Stacey's functions in the film.

The discreet homosexual nephew John turns into Stuart (Michael A. Anderson), a drag queen in the second film. In both films the detective follows the character into a gay bar. The difference is that in the first film John wears regular clothes, while in the second Stuart is in full drag. Cody laughs while dictating notes in a recorder, but still admits that Stuart has great legs. Stuart is more of a cartoonish gay stereotype than John.

The youthful niece Pamela turns into the bit older niece Liza (Lorraine Michaels) in the second film. Liza has her own sex scene with the houseboy Shane (Brett Clark). The difference in age was probably decided to allow this sex scene to have more nudity than would be acceptable from a teenaged character.

The second film adds a character with no counterpart in the original: Contessa Luciana (Sybil Danning). Contessa has a romantic night with Cody, before he moves into his next assignment. The relationship to the family is unspecified, but she turns out to have murdered Shane. She is beyond the reach of the law and suffers no ill consequences for her murder.

Anne Randall was a Playboy Playmate, the first to appear in a Sidaris' film. Following this film nearly all major female roles in a Sidaris' film were cast with either Playboy Playmates or Penthouse Pets.

Sources

See also
 List of American films of 1973

References

External links
 

1973 films
1970s exploitation films
American sexploitation films
Films directed by Andy Sidaris
New World Pictures films
American detective films
1970s crime action films
American crime action films
1970s English-language films
1970s American films